Jim Brothers (August 15, 1941 – August 20, 2013) was an American figurative sculptor from the U.S. state of Kansas. He died at the age of 72 at his home in Lawrence, Kansas, where he had received hospice care for cancer. His wife Kathy said he completed his final piece, a tribute to William Inge, "literally days before he died."

Notable works

Six bronzes for the National D-Day Memorial (including Across The Beach, Death On The Shore, Scaling The Heights) in Bedford, Virginia
Works at the National VFW Memorial (including Citizen Soldier) in Washington D.C.
Mark Twain life-size in Hartford, Connecticut.
Dwight D. Eisenhower life-size at the National Statuary Hall in Washington D.C.
Omar Bradley life-size in Moberly, MO.
Flight at GE Aircraft in St. Louis, Missouri
Veterans at VFW Memorial in Kansas City, Missouri
Kansas Promise at Cedar Crest in Topeka, Kansas
Protector of the Plains a bust of Paschal Fish, the founder of Eudora, Kansas.
From The Ashes at The Lawrence Visitors Center in Lawrence, Kansas
Homage at Gage Park in Topeka, Kansas
John Brown Jayhawk private collection in Lawrence, Kansas
Bust of Chief Red Cloud at The Nebraska State Capitol in Lincoln, Nebraska
Spirit of the CCC to commemorate the Civilian Conservation Corps
Harmony
The Vision

References

External links

Jim Brothers at The Leopold Gallery
Article on Brothers.

1941 births
2013 deaths
Deaths from cancer in Kansas
20th-century American sculptors
20th-century American male artists
21st-century American sculptors
21st-century American male artists
American male sculptors
People from Lawrence, Kansas
Artists from Kansas
People from Eureka, Kansas